The Mandjildjara, also written Manyjilyjarra, are an Aboriginal Australian people of Western Australia.

Country
It extended southwards some 50 miles as far the Tjanbari hill, and watering places they variously called Kolajuru, Karukada, Keweilba, and Kunkunba. They roamed eastwards as far as an unidentified waterhole known as Ngila.

History of contact
According to Tindale, in 1964, the patrol officer, Walter MacDougall came across a group of 9 aboriginal women at a place called Imiri in the area known as Percival Lakes, who identified themselves as Mandjildjara. At the time the whole area had suffered from severe drought conditions for over a decade, leading large numbers of desert peoples, often identified generically as Pintubi, to trek or straggle eastwards to places like Balgo and Papunya.

Alternative names
 Mandjiltjara, Mantjiltjara, Mandjildara, Mantjildjara, Manjiljara.
 Manyjilyjarra.

Notes

Citations

Sources

Aboriginal peoples of Western Australia
Mid West (Western Australia)